Pairwise generally means "occurring in pairs" or "two at a time."

Pairwise may also refer to:
 Pairwise disjoint
 Pairwise independence of random variables
 Pairwise comparison, the process of comparing two entities to determine which is preferred
 All-pairs testing, also known as pairwise testing, a software testing method.